Anouar Brahem ( أنور براهم); born on 20 October 1957) is a Tunisian oud player and composer. He is widely acclaimed as an innovator in his field. Performing primarily for a jazz audience, he combines Arabic classical music, folk music and jazz and has been recording since at least 1991, after becoming prominent in his own country in the late 1980s.

Biography

Brahem was born and raised in the Halfaouine neighbourhood in the Medina of Tunis, Tunisia. He studied oud at Tunisia's National Conservatory of Music and after that with oud master Ali Sriti. In 1981, he left for Paris in search of new vistas. This enabled him to meet musicians from a variety of genres. He remained there for four years, notably composing music for Tunisian cinema and theatre. He collaborated with Maurice Béjart for his ballet Thalassa Mare Nostrum and with Gabriel Yared as lutist for Costa Gavras’ film Hanna K..

After a period back in Tunisia in the late 1980s, when Brahem was appointed director of the Ensemble musical de la ville de Tunis, he toured in the United States and Canada and then signed with ECM Records, with whom he has recorded a series of critically acclaimed albums. These include Thimar, recorded with saxophonist John Surman and bassist Dave Holland.

Along with oud virtuosos Rabih Abou-Khalil and  Dhafer Youssef, Brahem has helped establish the oud as an important instrument of Ethno jazz. Most often he plays in an ensemble of three or four further musicians. He has collaborated throughout his career and on several albums with other musicians: Tunisian percussionist Lassad Hosni and violinist Bechir Selmi and Turkish clarinetist Barbaros Erköse. He has also performed live concerts with these same ensembles.

Anouar released Blue Maqams in 2017 with a band that included Jack DeJohnette, Dave Holland and Django Bates.

Selected discography

Solo albums

Collaborations 
 1994: Madar with Jan Garbarek and Ustad Shaukat Hussain.
 2002: Charmediterranéen with Orchestre National de Jazz and Gianluigi Trovesi.

References

External links
 Anouar Brahem’s official website
 Anouar Brahem’s official Youtube Channel
 Anouar Brahem - musicolog
 Anouar Brahem on ECM Records

1957 births
Living people
ECM Records artists
Modal jazz oud players
Tunisian jazz composers
People from Tunis Governorate
Tunisian oud players
Musicians from Tunis